MTV Hits is a 24-hour music television channel from ViacomCBS Networks EMEAA launched on 17 November 2015.

History 
The channels MTV Base, MTV Pulse, MTV Idol merged on November 17, 2015, to become MTV Hits. At the same time, BET becomes a channel in its own right, My MTV, an interactive music channel is created, MTV Rocks leaves CanalSat while on Numericable not to remove channels arrive MTV Dance, VH1 and VH1 Classic.

After weeks of negotiations an agreement has been reached between the Viacom and Canal groups, Canal Group retains the BET, MTV Hits and J-One channels.

Since April 2019, MTV Hits is available on all SFR networks (ADSL/FTTH/FTTB).

Since November 19, 2019, the channels of the ViacomCBS International Media Networks France group including J-One, Nickelodeon channels and other MTV and MTV Hits channels are now distributed to ADSL/Fiber operators, such as Free and are broadcast since January 28, 2020 at Bouygues Telecom which marks the end of exclusivity with Canal+ and will be very soon at Orange even if they are however available on the Fiber of the operator with the option proposed by the operator they since 2020 the ADSL offerings of Orange

Since January 14, 2020, the channel changes its numbering and is on channel 183 of the operator Canal+.

On October 8, 2021, the channel changed its logo and look. That same day at 9pm, it will broadcast an exclusive concert of Madonna's Madame X Tour, recorded in Lisbon.

MTV Hits ceased broadcast on April 20, 2022, on CanalSat.

Visual identity (logo)

Programming
Music programming 

 MTV Insomnia
 Beats & Lyrics
 Music & News
 Club Party
 MTV Classics Only (Rap & R&B only)
 Rap Only
 MTV Breakfast Club
 Les 50 Meilleurs Clips
 Les Papas du Rock
 10 Meilleurs Clips

 10 Meilleurs Clips France
 10 Meilleurs Clips Electronic
 10 Meilleurs Clips Rap
 10 Meilleurs Clips USA
 10 Meilleurs Clips Pop

 MTV World Stage
 My Life On MTV
 Hip-Hop My House

References

MTV channels
Television stations in France
Television channels and stations established in 2015
2015 establishments in France
Music organizations based in France